Nové Dvory is name of several locations in the Czech Republic:

Nové Dvory (Kutná Hora District), a market town in the Central Bohemian Region
Nové Dvory (Litoměřice District), a municipality and village in the Ústí nad Labem Region
Nové Dvory (Příbram District), a municipality and village in the Central Bohemian Region
Nové Dvory (Žďár nad Sázavou District), a municipality and village in the Vysočina Region